Szombierki Bytom is a Polish football club from Szombierki district of Bytom.  Szombierki currently competes in IV liga Silesia. Their greatest achievement was winning the Polish championship during the 1979–80 season.

Fans
Due to the number of large teams in close proximity the club has relatively modest support. The fans have strong cross-city rivalry with Polonia Bytom with whom they contest the Bytom derby. The used to have a strong friendship with fans of Szczakowianka Jaworzno.

Honours
Domestic
Ekstraklasa
Champions: 1979–80
Runners-up: 1964–65
Third place: 1980–81
Polish Cup
Semi-finalists: 1952, 1963, 1966 (reserves), 1973, 1979
Polish U-19
Runners-up: 1954, 1974
Europe
European Cup
Second Round: 1980–81
UEFA Cup
First Round: 1981–82
UEFA Intertoto Cup
Group Winner: 1964–65

European record

External links
 

 
Sport in Bytom
Szombierki
Football clubs in Silesian Voivodeship
Association football clubs established in 1945
1945 establishments in Poland
Mining association football clubs in Poland